Leon Bronstein (born July 20, 1951) is an Israeli sculptor.

Life
Bronstein was born July 20, 1951 in Tiraspol, Moldova. He graduated from the Tiraspol Technicum  (College) after completing his studies in the field of Engineering. During his last years in USSR, he worked as a watchmaker. In 1979, Bronstein “made aliyah”  (immigration) with his family to Israel, first residing in Or Akiva where he studied Hebrew in the Ulpan. Currently, he lives and works in the artist’s village of Ein Hod. He is married to Berta (Betty) and they have 3 children.

Career
Bronstein specializes in the semi-abstract style of art, using bronze as his preferred medium.
 
Initially, he started his sculpting career using wood as a medium. He worked with olive wood for several years. He began working in the sculpting department of “Touch Wood," a former factory manufacturing hand-made sculptures and memorabilia for tourists. After the factory closed he began his independent career as a sculptor. Bronstein’s first art exhibit took place in 1985 in New York’s Art Expo. He presented his work there, among other artists such as Alex Katz. After his first exhibition, he received an offer to be part of the permanent exhibition at the Emil Leonard Gallery in Soho, New York, USA.

In 1985, Bronstein began to use bronze exclusively, with his first sculptures being presented in the E.S. Lawrence Gallery in Aspen, Colorado, and Los Angeles, US.  In 1992, Bronstein was invited by the Minister of Culture of the USSR to exhibit his work in the International Russian Culture Foundation in Moscow, Soviet Union.
 
In 2001, his sculpture “To the Sky” was installed in the entrance to Terminal 1 at Ben-Gurion International Airport in Israel. An additional sculpture cast of “To the Sky” is located in the headquarters of Larson-Juhl Corporation in Atlanta, Georgia, USA. In 2002, he exhibited at the Triton Museum of Art in Santa Clara, California, USA. In 2004, the sculpture “Caring Hands” was installed in the Saint Louis Public Health Centre. In 2012, he participated in “Muse”, an outdoor sculptures exhibit, in Mamilla Avenue, Jerusalem.

In 2016, his sculpture “Exercises” was installed in the entrance to Ein Hod, an artist’s village in Israel. A twin statue of “Exercises” is located at Northland College, Wisconsin.  In 2018, the sculpture “Starry Starry Night” was installed in the Denver Botanic Gardens, Colorado, USA.

In 2020, an exhibition of Bronstein’s work took place at SLUMA, Saint Louis University Museum of Art, Missouri, USA. His sculpture “Sharing the Same Thoughts” was installed at the entrance to the museum. This exhibition is currently presented at the Caitlyn Gallery in Saint Louis, MO, USA.

References

 The Winter Family Collection, Leon Bronstein, Between the Real and the Fantastic, St Louis University MUSEUM of ART
 Miriam Or Dr. Art Historian and Art Critic, LEON BRONSTEIN - The Magic World Of Sculpture
 Russian International Cultural Foundation
 Ponzio Campus Center Northland College Ashland, WI.US
 Official Leon Brostein's Website https://www.leonbronstein.com/

External links 

 Artist's page at Lahaina Galleries
 Artist's page at Saatchi Art 
 Artist's page at Mary Martin Galleries
 Artist's page at Art Sy
The Caitlyn Gallery https://www.caitlyngallery.com/

Israeli people of Moldovan-Jewish descent
Israeli sculptors
1951 births
Living people